Callum L. Brown (born 27 April 1998) is a professional Australian rules footballer who last played for the Collingwood Football Club in the Australian Football League (AFL). Son of 1994–1998 former Collingwood captain, Gavin Brown, he played for the Eastern Ranges in the TAC Cup before he was drafted to Collingwood in 2016 under the father–son rule.

State football
Brown began playing in the TAC Cup with Oakleigh Chargers, but was cut from their under-16s and failed to make the under-18s. He then turned to the Eastern Ranges, where talent manager Len Villani pushed for him to join. He averaged 24 disposals over eight games and played in the 2015 TAC Cup Grand Final against Oakleigh Chargers. He also was selected for the 2016 TAC Cup Team of the Year. Brown represented Vic Metro at the 2016 AFL Under 18 Championships. In their match against Vic Country, he was named as one of the best after tallying 27 disposals and kicking a goal in the two point win. He was also named as one of the best in the final match of the Championships, against Western Australia, where the victory awarded them their first Division One title since 2012. His strong performances saw him selected for the season's All-Australian team.

AFL career
Brown was drafted by Collingwood with pick 35 in the 2016 national draft under the father–son rule, with Collingwood matching North Melbourne's bid. Despite the number 26 guernsey which his father wore being vacant, Brown chose to wear number 17 to create his own legacy. He started the season on the sidelines after being diagnosed with glandular fever during the 2017 season pre-season. In round 12 he made his debut for Collingwood, recording 16 disposals against Melbourne in a four-point loss.

After a 2022 AFL season in which both Brown and his brother Tyler failed to establish themselves in new coach Craig McRae's best 22, both Brown brothers were delisted at the conclusion of that season.

Personal life
Brown is the son of former Collingwood captain, Gavin Brown, and brother of his team-mate Tyler Brown. His sister, Tarni Brown, was selected for the 2020 AFL Women's (AFLW) academy and was drafted by Collingwood in the 2020 AFL Women's draft under the father-daughter rule. He was educated at Marcellin College, where he played Australian rules football and basketball, and was awarded the Terrance Cleary Memorial Award for Sporting Excellence.
Brown is studying for a Bachelor of Arts at Deakin University.

Statistics
Statistics are correct to the end of round 22, 2022

|-
! scope="row" style="text-align:center" | 2017
|
| 17 || 5 || 1 || 1 || 18 || 50 || 68 || 11 || 11 || 0.2 || 0.2 || 3.6 || 10.0 || 13.6 || 2.2 || 2.2
|- 
! scope="row" style="text-align:center" | 2018
|
| 17 || 8 || 1 || 1 || 49 || 76 || 125 || 13 || 38 || 0.1 || 0.1 || 6.1 || 9.5 || 15.6 || 1.6 || 4.8
|-
! scope="row" style="text-align:center" | 2019
|
| 17 || 22 || 11 || 13 || 160 || 162 || 322 || 58 || 89 || 0.5 || 0.6 || 7.3 || 7.4 || 14.6 || 2.6 || 4.0
|- 
! scope="row" style="text-align:center" | 2020
|
| 17 || 14 || 6 || 2 || 69 || 109 || 178 || 24 || 29 || 0.4 || 0.1 || 4.9 || 7.8 || 12.7 || 1.7 || 2.1
|-
! scope="row" style="text-align:center" | 2021
|
| 17 || 15 || 3 || 6 || 66 || 107 || 173 || 41 || 44 || 0.2 || 0.4 || 4.4 || 7.1 || 11.5 || 2.7 || 2.9
|-
! scope="row" style="text-align:center" | 2022
|
| 17 || 6 || 1 || 0 || 22 || 45 || 67 || 8 || 19 || 0.2 || 0.0 || 3.7 || 7.5 || 11.2 || 1.3 || 3.2
|- class="sortbottom"
! colspan=3| Career
! 70
! 23
! 23
! 384
! 549
! 933
! 155
! 230
! 0.3
! 0.3
! 5.5
! 7.8
! 13.3
! 2.2
! 3.3
|}

Notes

References

External links

1998 births
Living people
Collingwood Football Club players
Eastern Ranges players
Australian rules footballers from Victoria (Australia)
People educated at Marcellin College, Bulleen